Kobzar guilds, regional organizations of kobzars and lirnyks, were widespread in the mid-19th century. Modeled on artisans' guilds, they protected their members' interests. Every brotherhood had its own secret traditions and regulations. Its members collectively chose as their centre a church, for which they bought icons, candles, and oil. They met at the church on certain holy days to attend requiem services for deceased members and to settle urgent matters. In the spring they secretly gathered elsewhere (usually the forests near Brovary outside Kyiv) to elect their officers, to define the territory on which individual kobzars could operate, and to initiate new members according to a prescribed ritual. If necessary, the elected leader (pan otets) would call additional meetings. To become a member one had to have a physical handicap, to study kobza playing with a master (usually for at least two years), and to obtain permission (vyzvilka) to perform independently, to know the kobzars' lebiiskyi language, and to pay dues regularly.

A member who had violated a brotherhood's moral code was tried by a brotherhood's court. The severest punishment was ostracism. Lesser transgressors were whipped or fined. A member who chose to marry received a dowry from the brotherhood's treasury and was thereafter addressed in the polite second person plural by other members. If members caught a kobzar performing who had not received a vyzvilka, they destroyed his instrument, and he was fined and even beaten. The brotherhoods propagated the idea that kobzars were not beggars but professional artists, and instilled a sense of pride among their members; e.g., in asking or waiting for a reward, a member was forbidden to fall to his knees.

See also
Lirnyk
Bandurist
Kobzar

Sources
Мішалов, В. і М. Українські кобзарі-бандуристи – Сідней, Австралія, 1986 - 106с.
Самчук, У. - Живі струни - Детройт,  США, 1976  (468с.)

Blind musicians
Ukrainian music
Kobzarstvo
Bandura ensembles